Gian-Carlo may refer to:
Gian-Carlo Carra, Canadian politician
 Gian-Carlo Coppola (1963–1986), American film producer  
 Gian-Carlo Pascutto (born 1982), Belgian computer programmer
Gian-Carlo Rota (1932 – 1999) Italian mathematician and philosopher

See also

Gian Carlo
Giancarlo